Sarah Bloom Raskin (born April 15, 1961) is an American attorney and regulator who served as the 13th United States Deputy Secretary of the Treasury from 2014 to 2017. A member of the Democratic Party, Bloom Raskin previously served as a member of the Federal Reserve Board of Governors from 2010 to 2014. She also was Maryland commissioner of financial regulation and a managing director at the Promontory Financial Group. She is a Rubenstein Fellow at Duke University. In May 2017, she was elected to the board of directors for Reserve Trust Company, a Fintech company based in Colorado. In January 2022, President Joe Biden nominated her to succeed Randal Quarles as vice chair for supervision of the Federal Reserve. On March 15, 2022, she withdrew her nomination due to opposition from Republican senators and Democratic senator Joe Manchin.

Early life and education
Sarah Bloom was born to a Jewish family in Medford, Massachusetts, the daughter of Arlene (née Perlis) and Herbert Bloom. Bloom attended Homewood-Flossmoor High School in Flossmoor, Illinois, where she graduated in 1979.

After graduating from high school, she went on to Amherst College where she graduated magna cum laude and Phi Beta Kappa with a Bachelor of Arts in economics in 1983, and wrote her undergraduate thesis on monetary policy. She received her Juris Doctor from Harvard Law School in 1986. Raskin was honored with an honorary Doctorate of Humane Letters by Muhlenberg College on May 19, 2019.

Career

Government service 
Raskin worked as an associate at Arnold & Porter and as counsel for the Senate Banking Committee. Prior to serving as commissioner, she was a managing director at the Promontory Financial Group. Raskin also served as chief financial regulator for Maryland.

President Barack Obama nominated Raskin to the Federal Reserve Board along with fellow nominees Dr. Janet Yellen, president of the Federal Reserve Bank of San Francisco, and Peter A. Diamond, MIT institute professor of economics. Raskin and Yellen were unanimously confirmed as Federal Reserve Board governors by the United States Senate on September 30, 2010. On October 4, 2010, both were sworn in by Fed Chairman Ben Bernanke. As a member of the Federal Reserve Board, Raskin gained a reputation as someone focused on consumer protection and income inequality.

On July 31, 2013, President Barack Obama announced that he would nominate Raskin to the second-in-command position of deputy secretary at the United States Department of the Treasury. She was confirmed to the position on March 12, 2014, by a voice vote. Upon confirmation, Raskin became the highest-ranked woman in the history of the Treasury Department at that time. Raskin was sworn in on March 19, 2014. Upon her confirmation as deputy secretary, she resigned as a member of the Board of Governors of the Federal Reserve System on March 13, 2014. Raskin was the first woman to be confirmed to serve as deputy secretary. While serving her term, Raskin had a special focus on the macroeconomic impact of student loan borrowing and cyber security.

Post-government career 
During the 2017–2018 academic year, Raskin was a distinguished visiting professor at the University of Maryland Francis King Carey School of Law. 
During the 2018–2019 and 2019–2020 academic years, Raskin was a Rubenstein Fellow at Duke University. As a Rubenstein Fellow, she worked closely with the Rethinking Regulation program at Duke's Kenan Institute for Ethics and with the Global Financial Markets Center at Duke Law School to improve the public's understanding of markets and regulation. In particular, she led a research agenda that sought to shape a new relationship between regulation and resilience in financial markets. It also explored opportunities to harness cyber-data and turn it into a public asset rather than a liability.

In November 2020, Bloom Raskin was reported to be under consideration for secretary of the treasury in the Biden administration. In 2021, she was mentioned as a potential candidate to lead the Office of the Comptroller of the Currency (OCC).

Second Federal reserve nomination 
On January 14, 2022, Raskin was nominated by the Biden administration to serve as vice chairwoman for banking supervision at the Federal Reserve Board of Governors. Hearings were held before the Senate Banking Committee on February 3, 2022. Her nomination was opposed by Republican lawmakers, who boycotted a committee vote to advance her nomination to the entire Senate. This was in opposition to her views on the use of monetary policy to encourage the fossil-fuel industry to address climate change, as well as her work for the payments firm Reserve Trust. On March 14, Democratic senator Joe Manchin indicated that he wouldn't support Raskin's nomination, which was seen as "potentially dooming her chances for confirmation". On March 15, the Biden administration withdrew the nomination, at her request.

President Biden blamed Raskin's defeat on "baseless attacks from industry and conservative interest groups."

Personal life
Raskin is married to Jamie Raskin, a member of the U.S. House of Representatives from Maryland's , and as of 2006 lived in Takoma Park, Maryland.

Raskin and her husband have two adult daughters, Hannah and Tabitha. On December 31, 2020, Raskin's office announced that their son Thomas (Tommy), a graduate of Amherst College and a second-year student at Harvard Law School, died at the age of 25. On January 4, 2021, Raskin and her husband posted a tribute online which stated that Thomas had died by suicide after a prolonged battle with depression.

Notes

References

External links
U.S. Department of the Treasury biography – dead link
Sarah Bloom Raskin
 The Next Elizabeth Warren?

1961 births
Living people
Amherst College alumni
Arnold & Porter people
Federal Reserve System governors
Harvard Law School alumni
Homewood-Flossmoor High School alumni
Jewish American attorneys
Maryland lawyers
People from Takoma Park, Maryland
Politicians from Medford, Massachusetts
Obama administration personnel
United States Deputy Secretaries of the Treasury